Cachupa (Cape Verdean Creole Katxupa ) is a famous dish from the Cape Verde islands, West Africa.  It is a slow-cooked stew of corn (hominy), beans, cassava, sweet potato, fish or meat (sausage, pork, beef, goat or chicken), and often morcela (blood sausage). Referred to as the country's national dish, each island has its own regional variation. The version of the recipe called cachupa rica tends to have more ingredients than the simpler cachupa pobre.

Cachupa guisada 

Katchupa leftovers are often re-fried, the resulting dish being called Katchupa frita, cachupa guisada or cachupa refogada, meaning "fried Katchupa". This dish may be served for breakfast with a fried egg and a fried local sausage (linguiça) or fried mackerel.

Other
There is also a Cachupa Rica style that is served at Quintal da Música, music restaurant and club in the Plateau and the Center of Praia.

In São Tomé and Príncipe
It is also one of the most popular dishes of São Tomé and Príncipe. The dish has likely been brought from Cape Verde. It is prepared with green beans, broad beans and corn.

Legacy
Carmen Souza's fifth studio album, titled as Kachupada, is about this traditional food. It was released in 2013.

See also
 Cape Verdean cuisine
 List of African dishes
 List of stews
 Canjica or munguzá—a similar dish popular in northeastern Brazil using only corn in preparation

References

Further reading
 Mark Zanger, (2001), The American ethnic cookbook for students, ABC-CLIO
 Pierre Sorgial, "La table cap-verdienne" ("Capeverdean table")', Guide des îles du Cap-Vert, Karthala, Paris, 1995, p. 49-50  
 Jeanne, Jacob, Ashkenazi, Michael: The World Cookbook: The Greatest Recipes from Around the Globe. ABC-CLIO, 2014, p. 234.

External links

Video of a making of a Capeverdean Cachupa at the French cooking program Un diner presque parfait of the M6 network 

Cape Verdean cuisine
São Tomé and Príncipe cuisine
Stews
National dishes